Tapen Siga is a politician from Arunachal Pradesh state in India. He is the member of the Arunachal Pradesh Assembly for Daporijo in Upper Subansiri district. He belongs to the Bhartiya Janata Party.

References

People from Daporijo
Arunachal Pradesh MLAs 2014–2019
Bharatiya Janata Party politicians from Arunachal Pradesh